The Wallflower World Tour was a concert tour by Canadian singer and songwriter Diana Krall, in support of her twelfth studio album, Wallflower (2015). The tour began in Boston on February 25, 2015, and included dates in North America, Europe, and Asia.

Personnel 
 Diana Krall (piano, vocals)
 Anthony Wilson (guitar)
 Dennis Crouch (bass)
 Stuart Duncan (fiddle)
 Karriem Riggins (drums)
 Patrick Warren (keyboards)

Tour dates

Set list

Regular appearance 
 "We Just Couldn't Say Goodbye"
 "There Ain't No Sweet Man That's Worth the Salt of My Tears"
 "Just Like a Butterfly That's Caught in the Rain"
 "On the Sunny Side of the Street"
 "So Nice"
 "East of the Sun (and West of the Moon)"
 "Temptation"
 "Let's Face the Music and Dance"
 "The Frim-Fram Sauce"
 "A Case of You"
 "Exactly Like You"
 "Wallflower"
 "If I Take You Home Tonight"
 "Desperado"

Occasional appearance/Encore 
 "Let It Rain"
 "How Deep Is the Ocean?"
 "You Call It Madness"
 "'S Wonderful"
 "I've Got You Under My Skin"
 "Wide River to Cross"
 "'Deed I Do"
 "Boulevard of Broken Dreams"

References

2015 concert tours
2016 concert tours